Mark Thompson is a former member of the Arizona House of Representatives from January 2003 until January 2005. He was elected to the House in November 2002, representing the newly aligned District 17, after redistricting. In 2004, Thompson ran for re-election, and was one of the two Republicans to win in the primary, but lost in the general election to Democratic incumbent Meg Burton Cahill and fellow Republican Laura Knaperek.

References

Republican Party members of the Arizona House of Representatives
Living people
Year of birth missing (living people)
21st-century American politicians